Kenan Bajrić (born 20 December 1994) is a Slovenian professional footballer who plays as a defender for Pafos, on loan from Slovan Bratislava.

Honours
Olimpija Ljubljana
Slovenian PrvaLiga: 2015–16

Slovan Bratislava
Slovak Super Liga: 2018–19, 2019–20, 2020–21
Slovak Cup: 2017–18, 2019–20, 2020–21

References

External links
NZS profile 

1994 births
Living people
Footballers from Ljubljana
Slovenian footballers
Slovenian expatriate footballers
Slovenia youth international footballers
Slovenia under-21 international footballers
Slovenia international footballers
Bosniaks of Slovenia
Association football defenders
NK Olimpija Ljubljana (2005) players
ŠK Slovan Bratislava players
Pafos FC players
Slovenian PrvaLiga players
Slovak Super Liga players
Cypriot First Division players
Expatriate footballers in Slovakia
Slovenian expatriate sportspeople in Slovakia
Expatriate footballers in Cyprus
Slovenian expatriate sportspeople in Cyprus